Wilfred Frederick Shergold (born 18 September 1943) is an English former professional footballer who played as a left half.

Career
Born in Swindon, Shergold began his career with Swindon Town, making 37 league appearances. He signed for Bradford City in June 1966, making 28 league appearances for the club, before moving to Poole Town in July 1968.

Sources

References

1943 births
Living people
English footballers
Swindon Town F.C. players
Bradford City A.F.C. players
Poole Town F.C. players
English Football League players
Association football wing halves